This is a list of recent black college football classics that have taken place between historically black colleges and universities that compete in college football in the United States. Unlike bowl games, classics take place during college football's regular season; they differ from standard regular season games in that they are often accompanied by entertaining battle of the bands, parades, tailgate parties, social events, concerts, job fairs, and are often played at touristic neutral sites. Football classics annually attract large crowds of alumni, fans, and spectators in general, along with high media interest and corporate sponsorships.

History

Background
Special games pairing HBCUs have existed since at least 1915 when Wiley College played Homer College in a Louisiana State Fair-sponsored game (most recently called the "Red River State Fair Classic") in Shreveport, Louisiana. The earliest known use of the term "classic" to informally describe a black college football game occurred in 1919 on Thanksgiving Day, for a game between Howard and Lincoln (PA). The earliest documented use of "classic" as part of an annual black college football game's formal name dates to the Thanksgiving, 1921 "Colored Foot Ball Classic," played in Philadelphia between Howard and Lincoln (PA).

Though Grambling State's Eddie Robinson did not invent classic games, he is widely regarded as having perfected them as revenue-generating social events, and a chapter of his autobiography details his efforts at doing so. He was particularly proud of the success of the Bayou Classic, starting from its very first game with 76,000 patrons in attendance. It also developed a national television audience on NBC. As a result of Robinson's efforts, and its proximity to Grambling, Shreveport had established itself as the epicenter of black football classics, hosting at least five in the past (Red River State Fair Classic, Sugar Cup Classic, Red River Classic, Shreveport Football Classic, and Port City Classic). At present, however, Durham, North Carolina is a host to three annual classics and a fourth informal classic that is held there during even-numbered years; it also formerly used to host one called the Midway Classic and another called the Labor Day Classic (not to be confused with the existing classic of the same name based in Houston).

Game formats
Football classics come in three different kinds of formats. They can pair the same two rivals year after year, or they can feature a single host school with rotating opponents—most famously done during Florida A&M's association with the Orange Blossom Classic. Other classics, particularly those based in the northern and western U.S. where there are fewer HBCUs, simply invite two different schools every season.

Classics that do double as annual rivalry games sometimes consider the first game played under a classic-format as separate from the actual first game of the series, due to the pronounced differences in ambience surrounding the games. For example, Grambling and Southern first clashed in 1932 but today rarely acknowledge their games played prior to the formal creation of the Bayou Classic of New Orleans in 1974; indeed, the series even seems to have intensified since it has become more of a media spectacle—Southern initially won a solid 60% of the games in the series through 1973, but after it was reconfigured as a classic the following year, the series has been largely locked dead even (currently split at 24–24–0, through the 2021 season). One of the more noteworthy annual games that later converted into a classic was the Southern–Tennessee State series. Known as the Buck–Boar Classic starting with the 1958 contest, the losing school was required to hunt wild game that was to serve as the main course of the winning school's meal at their annual sports banquet—if SU lost, it was to hunt for deer in Louisiana's swamps and deliver the venison to TSU's banquet; if TSU lost, it was to hunt for wild boars in the Tennessee mountains and deliver the ham to SU's banquet. A Louisiana-based Turkey Day Classic between Dillard and Xavier played for "the 'Bone of Contention'—literally, the hind-femur of a bull, mounted on a plaque" during the 1940s and 1950s.

Among games that feature a permanent host with a rotating opponent, the Prairie View Bowl (first held in 1928) normally pitted Prairie View A&M against a school deemed to have had a worthy enough year to play in the season-ending game. Florida A&M's similar Orange Blossom Classic began in 1933 as a black equivalent to the segregated Orange Bowl (which was founded the year before as the Festival of Palms Bowl and was originally automatically hosted each season by the University of Miami). By the same token the Sugar Cup Classic—which was hosted yearly by Grambling, initially in New Orleans—offered an alternative to the segregated Sugar Bowl.

The third kind of classic—those featuring two different opponents each season—often occur outside of the southern U.S., where there are fewer HBCUs. These games have long appealed to those who were part of the Great Migration and were nostalgic to see teams from their home states.

The future of classic-style football games
As participants of the Great Migration have begun to age, it remains to be seen if their descendants (and others from completely different demographic groups) can sustain games that focus on teams from regions of the country that they are less familiar with. Indeed, several classics that were held in the North and West have ceased since 2000.

In addition, the schools themselves have also been forced to weigh the benefits of maintaining their historical ties with classics or to accept the changes of modern game scheduling. Improvements to all modes of transportation and the end of segregation have greatly increased the scheduling options of HBCUs. Also, HBCUs are increasingly scheduling "guarantee games"—roadtrips against National Collegiate Athletic Association Division I Football Bowl Subdivision schools that can guarantee high payouts but are also very difficult to win (all HBCUs compete in the NCAA's Football Championship Subdivision level or below in football). Because of the commitments of some universities—especially Southwestern Athletic Conference (SWAC) schools—to season-finale classic games, they may forgo the opportunity to participate in the FCS playoffs. The Bayou Classic and Alabama-based Turkey Day Classic, for example, are closely associated with Thanksgiving weekend—which directly conflicts with the playoffs' opening round. Labor Day weekend, with its season-opening games, is now the biggest weekend for classics—including the John A. Merritt Classic, the Texas-based Labor Day Classic, the MEAC/SWAC Challenge, and the Palmetto Capital City Classic.

Recent black college football classics (those active since 2000)
Listed below are black college football classics played since 2000. Classics listed in boldface remained active through the 2017 or 2018 seasons. In the cases where classics have shared the same exact name—there have been multiple "Capital City," "Labor Day," "Port City," "River City," "State Fair," and "Turkey Day" classics completely unrelated to each other, for example—the state of origin is also listed to differentiate between them. In the cases where classics have informal names, only those not outright opposed by both schools—such as the "Murk City Classic"—are listed.

See also

Black college football national championship
Celebration Bowl
Pioneer Bowl
SWAC Championship Game
Honda Battle of the Bands
List of NCAA college football rivalry games

References

 

 
College football-related lists